Tragedy and Hope: A History of the World in Our Time is a work of history written by former Georgetown University professor and historian Carroll Quigley. The book covers the period of roughly 1880 to 1963 and is multidisciplinary in nature though perhaps focusing on the economic problems brought about by the First World War and the impact these had on subsequent events. While global in scope, the book focuses on Western civilization.

The book has attracted the attention of those interested in geopolitics due to Quigley's assertion that a secret society initially led by Cecil Rhodes, Alfred Milner and others had considerable influence over British and American foreign policy in the first half of the twentieth century.  From 1909 to 1913, Milner organized the outer ring of this society as the semi-secret Round Table groups.

The book is written based on archived files from the Council on Foreign Relations.

See also
 Federal Reserve
 Monetary policy

References

External links
 Full text available

1966 non-fiction books
English non-fiction literature
Books about civilizations
Books about the West
Conspiracy theories